Verconia parva is a species of colourful sea slug, a dorid nudibranch, a shell-less marine gastropod mollusk in the family Chromodorididae.

Distribution 
This marine species occurs off Japan.

Description

References

Chromodorididae
Gastropods described in 1949